Cuilo is a town and municipality in Lunda Norte Province in Angola. The municipality had a population of 21,004 in 2014.

Distances

The following table gives the distance from Cuilo to each of the twenty-five largest cities of Angola.
Distance (Km)
 Cuilo - Luanda	  702 km
 Cuilo - Huambo	  511 km
 Cuilo - Lobito	  693 km
 Cuilo - Benguela	  723 km
 Cuilo - Kuito	  383 km
 Cuilo - Lubango	  848 km
 Cuilo - Malanje	  352 km
 Cuilo - Moçâmedes	  983 km
 Cuilo - Soyo	  900 km
 Cuilo - Saint Antonio Do Zaire	  900 km
 Cuilo - Kabinda	  949 km
 Cuilo - Uige	  561 km
 Cuilo - Saurimo	  107 km
 Cuilo - Sumbe	  634 km
 Cuilo - Caluquembe	  670 km
 Cuilo - Caluquembo	  670 km
 Cuilo - Caxito	  663 km
 Cuilo - Kashito	  663 km
 Cuilo - Longonjo	  563 km
 Cuilo - Congonjo	  563 km
 Cuilo - Cahala	  532 km
 Cuilo - Luene	  198 km
 Cuilo - Lucapa	  227 km
 Cuilo - General Machado	  312 km
 Cuilo - Menongue	  550 km

References

Populated places in Lunda Norte Province
Municipalities of Angola